Probalinthus or Probalinthos was a deme of ancient Attica, one of the Attic Tetrapolis (along with Marathon, Tricorythus, and Oenoe) located in the plain of Marathon. Probalinthus to the phyle Pandionis.

The site of Probalinthus is located southeast of modern Vrana.

References

Populated places in ancient Attica
Former populated places in Greece
Demoi